Ignacio Raúl Sánchez Barrera (born 20 June 1972) is a Mexican former professional footballer and current manager.

References

External links

1972 births
Living people
Association football goalkeepers
Club Puebla players
C.F. Mérida footballers
Liga MX players
Mexican football managers
Footballers from Puebla
People from Puebla (city)
Club Puebla non-playing staff
Mexican footballers